Boris Krstić (born 25 June 2003) is a Serbian professional footballer who currently plays  as a forward for MŠK Žilina in the Fortuna Liga.

Club career

MŠK Žilina
Krstić joined MŠK Žilina as a youth prospect from Serbian club FK Partizan in August 2022. Initially, he started playing for reserve team in the Slovak 2. liga. Krstić netted 10 goals in 14 appearances for Žilina B team. 

He made his Fortuna Liga debut for Žilina against FC ViOn Zlaté Moravce on 28 October 2022. Krstić came on in the 78th minute of the match, replacing Kristián Bari.

References

External links
 MŠK Žilina official club profile 
 
 Futbalnet profile 
 

2003 births
Living people
Sportspeople from Niš
Serbian footballers
Serbia youth international footballers
Association football forwards
FK Partizan players
FK Teleoptik players
MŠK Žilina players
2. Liga (Slovakia) players
Slovak Super Liga players
Serbian expatriate footballers
Serbian expatriate sportspeople in Slovakia
Expatriate footballers in Slovakia